The Young Fritz is a 1943 Soviet short film directed by Grigori Kozintsev and Leonid Trauberg based on a short satiric poem by Samuil Marshak.

Cast
 Mikhail Zharov - Fritz
 Maksim Shtraukh - Examining professor
 Mikhail Astangov - Teacher
 Vsevolod Pudovkin - Officer
 Yanina Zhejmo
 Mikhail Vysotsky - Father
 Lydia Atmanaki - Mother
 Lyudmila Shabalina - Tour guide in Museum of the Future
 Konstantin Sorokin - Franz

External links

1943 films
Lenfilm films
Soviet black-and-white films
Films directed by Grigori Kozintsev
Films directed by Leonid Trauberg